Emil William Capper Nava (born 29 March 1985) is a British music video director.

After leaving school at 16, Emil started his career as a chef. He shot to fame after directing Jessie J's song "Do It Like A Dude". He has since directed over 100 music videos for global musicians such as Jessie J, LunchMoney Lewis, Calvin Harris, Jennifer Lopez, Ellie Goulding, Rita Ora, Alesso, Juicy J, Ed Sheeran, Zara Larsson, PrettyMuch, Nick Jonas, Bebe Rexha, Camila Cabello, Liam Payne, Charlie Puth, Julia Michaels, Hailee Steinfeld, Dua Lipa, Selena Gomez, Pharrell, T.I., Ne-Yo, Taio Cruz, Rudimental and Post Malone among others. In 2019, Emil founded Ammolite, Inc., a creative and production studio in Los Angeles, California.

He is the younger half-brother of fellow director Jake Nava.

Music videos

References

External links
 

British music video directors
Living people
Artists from London
British expatriates in the United States
1985 births
British people of Mexican descent
British people of Dutch-Jewish descent
British people of Austrian-Jewish descent